The 2022 Copa Argentina Final was the 62nd and final match of the 2021–22 Copa Argentina. It was played on 30 October 2022 at Estadio Malvinas Argentinas in Mendoza between Talleres (C) and Patronato.

Patronato defeated Talleres (C) by a 1–0 score to win their first title in the tournament. As winners, they qualified for the 2023 Copa Libertadores group stage and earned the right to play against the winners of the 2022 Argentine Primera División in the 2022 Supercopa Argentina.

Qualified teams

Road to the final

Match details

Statistics

References

External links
 Match report at Copa Argentina website 

2022 in Argentine football
2021–22
2021–22 domestic association football cups